Roberto Edy Punina Salvador (born July 2, 1967) is a retired male athlete from Ecuador, who competed in the long-distance running events during his career. He represented his native country at the 1992 Summer Olympics. Punina set his personal best in the men's 10,000 metres (30.00.4) in 1991.

References
sports-reference

1967 births
Living people
Ecuadorian male long-distance runners
Olympic athletes of Ecuador
Athletes (track and field) at the 1992 Summer Olympics
Athletes (track and field) at the 1995 Pan American Games
Pan American Games competitors for Ecuador